Isaac Kulp Farm is a historic home and farm located in Upper Gwynedd Township, Montgomery County, Pennsylvania.  The property includes three contributing buildings.  They are the farmhouse (1832), Pennsylvania bank barn and root cellar.  The farmhouse is a three-story, five bay by two bay, stucco covered stone Georgian style dwelling with Italianate details.  It has a one-story, stone addition.

The farm was added to the National Register of Historic Places in 1999.

The property is owned by Delaware Valley University and was operated as the Roth Living Farm Museum until 2012, when it became the Roth Center for Sustainable Agriculture.

References

Farms on the National Register of Historic Places in Pennsylvania
Georgian architecture in Pennsylvania
Houses completed in 1832
Houses in Montgomery County, Pennsylvania
Delaware Valley University
National Register of Historic Places in Montgomery County, Pennsylvania